Alexia Fernanda Delgado Alvarado (born 9 December 1999) is a Mexican footballer who plays as a midfielder for Liga MX Femenil club Cruz Azul and the Mexico women's national team.

International career
Delgado made her senior debut on 1 March 2019 in a friendly match against Thailand.

Career statistics

Club

International

Honors
Mexico under-20
 CONCACAF Women's U-20 Championship: 2018

References

External links

 
 
 
 

1999 births
Living people
Mexican women's footballers
Footballers from Nayarit
Sportspeople from Tepic, Nayarit
Women's association football midfielders
Arizona State Sun Devils women's soccer players
Club América (women) footballers
Cruz Azul (women) footballers
Liga MX Femenil players
Mexico women's international footballers
Mexico women's youth international footballers
Mexican expatriate women's footballers
Expatriate women's soccer players in the United States
Mexican expatriate sportspeople in the United States
Mexican footballers